Clogherhead Lifeboat Station is situated in Clogherhead, Co Louth, Ireland and has been in operation since 1899 

From 1993 the station operated a  All-Weather lifeboat (ALB) ON1190 Doris Bleasdale 12-31 which was formally replaced by the new  ON1338 Michael O’Brien 13-31 at 13:31 on 08/07/2019.

History 
Rescues have been taking place out of Clogherhead at least as early as 1826. with a Lifeboat Station being established in 1899. In 1993 the station saw its boathouse rebuilt to accommodate the modern  lifeboat.
|

All Weather Boats (ALB)

See also
List of RNLI stations

References

External links
Clogherhead Lifeboat Station Website (RNLI)

Sea rescue
Lifeboat stations in Ireland